Interstate 20 (I-20) is the main east–west Interstate Highway in the state of South Carolina, linking the state with important transportation and business hubs to the north, west, and south, including Atlanta, Georgia; Charlotte, North Carolina (via I-77); Savannah, Georgia (via I-95); and Washington, D.C. (via I-95).

Route description
I-20 enters the Palmetto State after crossing the Savannah River from Augusta, Georgia. Known as the J. Strom Thurmond Freeway (named for the US senator), the highway heads northeastward, bypassing Aiken and Lexington before reaching the state capital of Columbia. It was constructed in various stages beginning in late 1963, with the final section between South Carolina Highway 340 (SC 340) and Interstate 20 Business (I-20 Bus.) opening in August 1975.

At Columbia, I-20 crosses the Saluda and Broad rivers and travels through the northern part of the city and turns eastward, bypassing Fort Jackson and Camden before reaching Florence. It is at Florence where I-20 sees its eastern terminus at I-95.

Services
The South Carolina Department of Transportation (SCDOT) operates and maintains one welcome center and two rest areas along I-20. The welcome center, which has a travel information facility on site, is located in North Augusta at milemarker 0.5 (eastbound), and the rest areas are located in Lugoff at milemarker 99 (east and westbound) between exit 92 (U.S. Route 601 [US 601] and SC 12) and the bridges over the Wateree River. Common at all locations are public restrooms, public telephones, vending machines, picnic area, and barbecue grills. A pair of closed rest areas exist between exits 44 and 51.

The South Carolina Department of Public Safety and State Transport Police operate and maintain two truck inspection/weigh stations. The eastbound truck weigh station can be found in Jones Crossroads at milemarker 35, and the westbound weigh station can be found in Lexington at milemarker 53.5.

History

I-20 first appeared between 1964 and 1967; its first section was completed from SC 6, south of Lexington, to Spears Creek Church Road (S-40-53), south of Pontiac. A second section, from the Georgia state line to US 25/SC 121, was completed in 1967. In 1968 or 1969, I-20 was extended east from Spears Creek Church Road (S-40-53) to US 601/SC 12, south of Camden. In 1971, I-20 combined the two segments by completing the gap between US 25/SC 121 to SC 6. In 1973, I-20 was extended east to US 521. In 1974, it extended east again to US 15. In 1975, another extension east to US 401. And finally, in 1976, I-20 reached its destination with I-95 and the city of Florence. Also in the same year, exit numbers were installed.

In the late 1980s, I-20 was widened to six lanes between US 378 and I-77.

Proposed extensions
The first proposal to extend I-20 was at the time of its designation in the state, and consisted of plans to extend it east from Florence to Myrtle Beach. However, because Myrtle Beach was not yet the tourist destination it later became, the state eventually widened US 76 and US 501 and established SC 576, connecting the two U.S. Routes in the 1970s.

In 2003, North Carolina Governor Mike Easley pushed forward a proposal to extend I-20 eastward from Florence to Wilmington, which became part of the North Carolina Department of Transportation's strategic transportation plan. The proposed routing would overlap I-20 along I-95 to the I-74/US 74 interchange, then travel east (concurrently with US 74) into Wilmington. In 2005, this proposal became part of the SAFETEA-LU transportation legislation, and North Carolina received $5 million for a feasibility study for this extension.

While the extension had support in North Carolina, with justification that a direct route from Atlanta to the Port of Wilmington could be a boom to the economy, this view was not shared by officials in South Carolina. In 2009, soon after Governor Mike Easley left office, the proposed routing was removed from all NCDOT plans and was officially dropped. The proposal was never officially discussed with SCDOT nor submitted to the American Association of State Highway and Transportation Officials and the Federal Highway Administration (FHWA) for consideration.

Future

I-26/I-126 interchange 
SCDOT, in cooperation with the FHWA, is proposing improvements to a corridor along I-20, I-26, and I-126, including the system interchanges at I-20/I-26 and I-26/I-126 in Lexington and Richland counties. These improvements are proposed to increase mobility and enhance traffic operations by reducing existing traffic congestion within the corridor, while accommodating future traffic needs.

Widening projects 
This project represents the first bistate agreement between the Georgia Department of Transportation and SCDOT for a design–build project. This design–build project is for the widening of I-20 with an additional lane in each direction. The widening begins just west of Georgia State Route 104 (SR 104) interchange (I-20 GA exit 200) and it will terminate at SC 230 interchange (I-20 SC exit 1). The project will widen  of I-20, replace four bridges over the Augusta Canal and Savannah River, and make intersection improvements at the West Martintown Road interchange in South Carolina. This project will cost $72 million and is scheduled to be completed in 2022.

Another design–build project is for the widening of I-20 with an additional lane in each direction. The widening will begin just east of US 378 where the roadway transitions from a six lane section to a four lane section and terminate west of the Longs Pond Road interchange near milemarker 49 in Lexington County. The I-20 eastbound and westbound bridges over Norfolk Southern Railroad will be replaced. The pavement for the project will consist of both concrete and asphalt and the existing concrete pavement section will require reconstruction. The widening has since been completed as of June 2022.

Exit list

Related routes
I-20 has one business route and one auxiliary route in the state of South Carolina. I-520 serves as a multi-state beltway that runs between North Augusta and Augusta, Georgia.

Interstate 20 Business

Interstate 20 Business (I-20 Bus) is a  four-lane boulevard-grade business spur of I-20 along David H. McLeod Boulevard, between I-95 and West Evans Street. At its eastern end, the roadway continues as US 76 Connector. Construction began by 1969, completed in 1970, it has remained unchanged since inception.

See also
 
 Central Savannah River Area

References

External links

Mapmikey's South Carolina Highways Page: I-20
South Carolina @ Southeast Roads.com - Interstate 20
I-20 in NC discussion on I-74 in North Carolina Progress Page, accessed October 4, 2005.

20
 South Carolina
Transportation in Aiken County, South Carolina
Transportation in Lexington County, South Carolina
Transportation in Richland County, South Carolina
Transportation in Kershaw County, South Carolina
Transportation in Lee County, South Carolina
Transportation in Darlington County, South Carolina
Transportation in Florence County, South Carolina